The women's team golf event at the 2017 Summer Universiade was held from 24–26 August at the Sunrise Golf & Country Club in Taoyuan, Taiwan.

Results

References 

Women's team